Sturisomatichthys panamense is a species of armored catfish native to Caribbean-slope rivers of Colombia, as well as Pacific-slope rivers of Ecuador and Panama. This species grows to a length of  SL.

References

Freshwater fish of Colombia
Freshwater fish of Ecuador
Fish of Panama
Fish described in 1889